MYM may refer to:
 MeetYourMakers, an esports organisation based in Sweden
 Mujahideen Youth Movement, a jihadist group better known as al-Shabaab
 MyM, a British entertainment magazine